The 2003 season was the 73rd completed season of Finnish Football League Championship, known as the Veikkausliiga.  At the same time it was the 14th season of the Veikkausliiga.

Overview
The Veikkausliiga is administered by the Finnish Football Association and the competition's 2003 season was contested by 14 teams. HJK Helsinki won the championship and qualified for the 2004–05 UEFA Champions League qualification round, while the second and sixth placed teams qualified for the first qualification round of the 2004–05 UEFA Cup. The third and fourth placed teams qualified for the UEFA Intertoto Cup 2004, while FC KooTeePee and KuPS Kuopio were relegated to the Ykkönen.

Participating clubs 
In 2003 there were 14 participants in the Veikkausliiga:

 Allianssi Vantaa
 FC Jazz Pori 
 FC Hämeenlinna
 FC KooTeePee - Promoted from Ykkönen
 FC Lahti 
 Haka Valkeakoski 
 HJK Helsinki 
 Inter Turku 
 Jaro Pietarsaari 
 FC Jokerit - Promoted from Ykkönen 
 KuPS Kuopio
 MyPa 47 Anjalankoski 
 Tampere United
 TPS Turku - Promoted from Ykkönen

League standings

Promotion/relegation playoff

RoPS Rovaniemi - KooTeePee Kotka  4-1
KooTeePee Kotka - RoPS Rovaniemi  3-2

RoPS Rovaniemi promoted, KooTeePee Kotka relegated.

Results

Leading scorers

Footnotes

References
Finland - List of final tables (RSSSF)

Veikkausliiga seasons
Fin
Fin
1